Daniel Pearson may refer to:
Daniel Pearson (actor) (born 1996), English actor and presenter
Daniel Pearson (musician) (born 1982), English musician and songwriter
Daniel Pearson (cyclist) (born 1994), Welsh cyclist
Daniel R. Pearson, commissioner and former chairman of the United States International Trade Commission

See also
Danny Pearson (disambiguation)
Dan Pearson (disambiguation)